Take Me Somewhere Nice is a 2019 Dutch drama film directed by Ena Sendijarević. In July 2019, it was shortlisted as one of the nine films in contention to be the Dutch entry for the Academy Award for Best International Feature Film at the 92nd Academy Awards, but it was not selected.

It premiered in the Hivos Tiger competition of the Rotterdam Filmfestival, where it won the Special Jury Award for Outstanding Artistic Achievement. It also won the Heart of Sarajevo award for Best Feature Film at the Sarajevo Film Festival and was named Best Feature Film at the Seoul International Women's Film Festival.

Cast
Lazar Dragojević as Denis
Ernad Prnjavorac as Emir
Sara Luna Zorić as Alma
Mirsad Tuka

References

External links

2019 films
2019 drama films
Dutch drama films
Bosnian-language films
2010s Dutch-language films
2010s English-language films
Heart of Sarajevo Award for Best Film winners
2019 multilingual films
Dutch multilingual films